"Song for Ronnie James" is a song by Norwegian heavy metal singer Jorn from the tribute album Dio. It was written as a tribute to the deceased Ronnie James Dio who died a couple of months earlier. The song is the only one on the album which is not a Dio / Black Sabbath / Rainbow cover. It has since been performed live many times.

The music video, together with the announcement of the tribute album, was released on the internet just five days after the news of Dio's death in May 2010, which caused some critique and speculation, as Lande was accused of exploiting the death of Dio. Later the record company explained that the album had been in the works since spring of 2009.

References

External links
 Jørn's official site
 

Song for Ronnie James
Commemoration songs
Songs about musicians
Songs about rock music
Cultural depictions of rock musicians
Cultural depictions of British men